On 19 August 2021, a 15-year-old male student, Hugo Jackson, armed with four knives and two fake pistols entered Källeberg School in Eslöv, Sweden. During the attack, which the perpetrator livestreamed on Twitch, one teacher was stabbed. The attacker was arrested after unsuccessfully attempting a suicide by cop by aiming a fake pistol at first responders.

The attack came before another stabbing at a school in Kristianstad, Sweden, in which a 16-year-old male student, Laaiti Ekenstéen, stabbed a teacher and a student on 10 January 2022. The perpetrators of the Eslöv attack and the Kristianstad attack were in close contact with each other.

Background 
Sweden and wider Scandinavia has had a history of right-wing extremism, including a stabbing attack at a school in Trollhättan, Sweden in 2015. Often these attacks are influenced by a discontent with immigration policies and will target immigrants and minority ethnic groups.

The livestreaming of right-wing terrorist attacks online, thought to have been first used and popularised in the Christchurch mosque shootings, has become increasingly utilised.

Attack 
On 19 August 2021 at around 8:06 am the perpetrator arrived at Källeberg School carrying a sports bag that contained equipment and weaponry including two fake pistols, four knives, a protective vest adorned with a patch of the Swedish flag and a combat helmet with the Swedish flag on either side with a GoPro mount attached. After using a changing room to put on the protective vest and helmet as well as a skeleton mask and skeleton fingerless gloves, the perpetrator began a live-stream on Twitch using his mobile phone as a camera, propping it up to film himself. Upon starting the stream he said "Remember lads subscribe to PewDiePie", quoting the perpetrator of the Christchurch mosque shooting. He eventually attached the phone to his helmet and proceeded towards a school building with a knife in his hand.

Eight minutes and 16 seconds after starting the broadcast at around 8:35 - 8:40 pm the perpetrator entered the school cafeteria and approached a 45-year-old PE teacher, who did not recognise the perpetrator despite him being a student of his. The perpetrator then stabbed the teacher in the stomach. Students in and around the cafeteria began to flee and the school was eventually placed on lockdown. The teacher remained conscious and applied pressure to his wound while on the ground as the perpetrator walked around the cafeteria and threatened those who he came across or had tried to help the injured teacher.

Around 15 minutes after starting the livestream the perpetrator exited the building and threatened students who had fled the school via the windows by aiming his fake pistol and shouting at them. Shortly after he was confronted by a responding officer who ordered him to drop his weapons at gunpoint. The perpetrator proceeded to aim his fake pistol at the officer, demanding to be shot. The officer fired some warning shots at the ground around the perpetrator, leading to the perpetrator dropping his weapons, laying down on the ground and being arrested.

Perpetrator 
The attacker was a 15-year-old student of the school. According to police the perpetrator had an interest in white supremacy, Nazism, school shootings and instances of right-wing terrorism.

Inaction by law enforcement and social services 
The perpetrator had been reported to, questioned and visited by police several times in the year leading up to the attack. In almost every instance the police forwarded the case to social services. Teachers at school expressed frustration at the inaction of social services to the police, having voiced concerns about the perpetrator bringing knives to school and believing he could harm someone at school. Among the officers these concerns were expressed to included an officer who had previously witnessed the perpetrator wearing a swastika arm band and knew the perpetrator had pictures of school shooters and Nazi imagery in his possession.

On 6 August 2021 Swedish authorities received a tip from the FBI entailing that an individual had made plans to commit a school shooting in Sweden, which was traced to the perpetrator. Four police officers visited the perpetrator at his home for questioning. No action was taken against the perpetrator, instead another report was filed to social services.

Links to the Kristianstad school attack perpetrator 
On 10 January 2022 a 16-year-old student, Laaiti Ekenstéen, attacked his school in Kristianstad, Sweden armed with 4 knives, wounding a 53-year-old teacher and 16-year-old student and classmate. The perpetrator of this attack was in close contact with the Eslöv attacker through online communication. According to the Eslöv attacker, the two were ‘blood brothers’. They met on the online video game Roblox and had been friends for around 6 years before the attack, communicating through various social media platforms and meeting in person 4 or 5 times. The Kristianstad attacker told police that he and the Eslöv attacker would discuss and joke about topics like politics, racism and the video of the Christchurch mosque shootings livestream. These discussions between the Kristianstad attacker and police occurred prior to the Kristianstad school attack and were part of the investigation into the Eslöv attack. The extent of the knowledge the Kristianstad attacker had of the Eslöv attacker's plans or if he aided him at all is unclear. The Kristianstad attacker also wrote a manifesto, though it has never been released to the public. He was sentenced to 3 years in a youth detention.

Legal proceedings 
On 22 December 2021, the perpetrator was sentenced to 2.5 years in a youth detention after being found guilty of attempted murder and nine counts of grossly unlawful threats. He was ordered to pay damages to victims.

On 16 March 2022, the perpetrator was convicted for a further four charges of grossly unlawful threats. His sentence remained the same, though he was ordered to pay additional damages.

See also 
 Livestreamed crime
 Terrorism in Sweden
 List of right-wing terrorist attacks
 List of school-related attacks

References

Stabbing attacks in 2021
August 2021 crimes in Europe
2021 crimes in Sweden
Stabbing attacks in Sweden
Livestreamed crimes
Far-right politics in Sweden